Statistics Greenland is a central statistical organization in Greenland, operating  under the auspices of the Government of Greenland, working in cooperation with the Ministry for Finance. Based in Nuuk, the capital of Greenland, the organization was founded on 19 July 1989 by the Government of Greenland.

See also 
 List of national and international statistical services

References

External links 
 Statistics Greenland home page (English version)

Nuuk
Greenland
Organisations based in Greenland